Pumice, called pumicite in its powdered or dust form, is a volcanic rock that consists of highly vesicular rough-textured volcanic glass, which may or may not contain crystals. It is typically light-colored. Scoria is another vesicular volcanic rock that differs from pumice in having larger vesicles, thicker vesicle walls, and being dark colored and denser.

Pumice is created when super-heated, highly pressurized rock is violently ejected from a volcano. The unusual foamy configuration of pumice happens because of simultaneous rapid cooling and rapid depressurization. The depressurization creates bubbles by lowering the solubility of gases (including water and CO2) that are dissolved in the lava, causing the gases to rapidly exsolve (like the bubbles of CO2 that appear when a carbonated drink is opened). The simultaneous cooling and depressurization freeze the bubbles in a matrix.  Eruptions under water are rapidly cooled and the large volume of pumice created can be a shipping hazard for cargo ships.

Properties
Pumice is composed of highly microvesicular glass pyroclastic with very thin, translucent bubble walls of extrusive igneous rock. It is commonly but not exclusively of silicic or felsic to intermediate in composition (e.g., rhyolitic, dacitic, andesite, pantellerite, phonolite, trachyte), but basaltic and other compositions are known. Pumice is commonly pale in color, ranging from white, cream, blue or grey, to green-brown or black. It forms when volcanic gases exsolving from viscous magma form bubbles that remain within the viscous magma as it cools to glass. Pumice is a common product of explosive eruptions (plinian and ignimbrite-forming) and commonly forms zones in upper parts of silicic lavas. Pumice has a porosity of 64–85% by volume and it floats on water, possibly for years, until it eventually becomes waterlogged and sinks.

Scoria differs from pumice in being denser. With larger vesicles and thicker vesicle walls, scoria sinks rapidly. The difference is the result of the lower viscosity of the magma that forms scoria. When larger amounts of gas are present, the result is a finer-grained variety of pumice known as pumicite. Pumicite consists of particles less than 4mm in size. Pumice is considered a volcanic glass because it has no crystal structure. Pumice varies in density according to the thickness of the solid material between the bubbles; many samples float in water. After the explosion of Krakatoa, rafts of pumice drifted through the Indian Ocean for up to 20 years, with tree trunks floating among them. In fact, pumice rafts disperse and support several marine species. In 1979, 1984 and 2006, underwater volcanic eruptions near Tonga created large pumice rafts that floated hundreds of kilometres to Fiji.

There are two main forms of vesicles. Most pumice contains tubular microvesicles that can impart a silky or fibrous fabric. The elongation of the microvesicles occurs due to ductile elongation in the volcanic conduit or, in the case of pumiceous lavas, during flow. The other form of vesicles are subspherical to spherical and result from high vapor pressure during an eruption. Reticulite is a type of basaltic pumice formed in very high lava fountains. It has an extremely low density and is composed of a network of volcanic glass formed when the vesicles have almost completely coalesced.

Etymology
Pumice is an igneous rock with a foamy appearance. The name is derived from the Latin word pumex (meaning "pumice") which is related to the Latin word spuma meaning "foam". In former times, pumice was called "Spuma Maris", meaning "froth of the sea" in Latin because the frothy material was thought to be hardened sea foam. Around 80 B.C., it was called "lapis spongiae" in Latin for its vesicular properties. Many Greek scholars decided there were different sources of pumice, one of which was in the sea coral category.

Area
Pumice can be found all around the globe deriving from continental volcanic occurrences and submarine volcanic occurrences. Floating stones can also be distributed by ocean currents. As described earlier pumice is produced by the eruption of explosive volcanoes under certain conditions, therefore, natural sources occur in volcanically active regions. Pumice is mined and transported from these regions. In 2011, Italy and Turkey led pumice mining production at 4 and 3 million tonnes respectively; other large producers at or exceeding a million tonnes were Greece, Iran, Chile, and Syria. Total world pumice production in 2011 was estimated at 17 million tonnes.

Asia
There are large reserves of pumice in Asian countries including Afghanistan, Indonesia, Japan, Syria, Iran, and eastern Russia. Considerable amounts of pumice can be found at the Kamchatka Peninsula on the eastern flank of Russia. This area contains 19 active volcanoes and it lies in close proximity with the Pacific volcanic belt. Asia is also the site of the second-most dangerous volcanic eruption in the 20th century, Mount Pinatubo, which erupted on June 12, 1991 in the Philippines. Ash and pumice lapilli were distributed over a mile around the volcano. These ejections filled trenches that once reached 660 feet deep. So much magma was displaced from the vent that the volcano became a depression on the surface of the Earth. Another well-known volcano that produces pumice is Krakatoa. An eruption in 1883 ejected so much pumice that kilometers of sea were covered in floating pumice and in some areas rose 1.5 meters above sea level.

Europe
Europe is the largest producer of pumice with deposits in Italy, Turkey, Greece, Hungary, Iceland, and Germany. Italy is the largest producer of pumice because of its numerous eruptive volcanoes. On the Aeolian Islands of Italy, the island of Lipari is entirely made up of volcanic rock, including pumice. Large amounts of igneous rock on Lipari are due to the numerous extended periods of volcanic activity from the Late Pleistocene (Tyrrhenian) to the Holocene.

North America
Pumice can be found all across North America including on the Caribbean Islands. In the United States, pumice is mined in Nevada, Oregon, Idaho, Arizona, California, New Mexico and Kansas. U.S. production of pumice and pumicite in 2011 was estimated at 380,000 tonnes, valued at $7.7 million with approximately 46% coming from Nevada and Oregon. Idaho is also known as a large producer of pumice because of the quality and brightness of the rock found in local reserves. One of the most famous volcanoes was Mount Mazama that erupted 7,700 years ago in Oregon and deposited 300 feet of pumice and ash around the vent. The large amount of magma that was erupted caused the structure to collapse, forming a caldera now known as Crater Lake.

South America
Chile is one of the leading producers of pumice in the world. The Puyehue-Cordón Caulle are two coalesced volcanoes in the Andes mountains that ejected ash and pumice across Chile and Argentina. A recent eruption in 2011 wreaked havoc on the region by covering all surfaces and lakes in ash and pumice.

Africa
Kenya, Ethiopia and Tanzania have some deposits of pumice.

New Zealand
The Havre Seamount volcano produced the largest-known deep ocean volcanic eruption on Earth. The volcano erupted in July 2012 but remained unnoticed until enormous pieces of pumice were seen to be floating on the Pacific Ocean. Blankets of rock reached a thickness of 5 meters. Most of this floating pumice is deposited on the North-West coast of New Zealand and the Polynesia islands.

Mining
The mining of pumice is an environmentally friendly process compared with other mining methods because the igneous rock is deposited on the surface of the earth in loose aggregate form. The material is mined by open-pit methods. Soils are removed by machinery in order to obtain more pure quality pumice. Scalping screens are used to filter impure surficial pumice of organic soils and unwanted rocks. Blasting is not necessary because the material is unconsolidated, therefore only simple machinery is used such as bulldozers and power shovels. Different sizes of pumice are needed for specific uses therefore crushers are used to achieve desired grades ranging from lump, coarse, intermediate, fine, and extra fine.

Uses
Pumice is a very lightweight, porous and abrasive material and it has been used for centuries in the construction and beauty industry as well as in early medicine. It is also used as an abrasive, especially in polishes, pencil erasers, and the production of stone-washed jeans. Pumice was also used in the early book-making industry to prepare parchment paper and leather bindings. There is high demand for pumice, particularly for water filtration, chemical spill containment, cement manufacturing, horticulture and increasingly for the pet industry. The mining of pumice in environmentally sensitive areas has been under more scrutiny after such an operation was stopped in the U.S. state of Oregon, at Rock Mesa in the southern part of the Three Sisters Wilderness.

Early medicine
Pumice has been used in the medicinal industry for more than 2000 years. Ancient Chinese medicine used ground pumice along with ground mica and fossilized bones added to teas to calm the spirit. This tea was used to treat dizziness, nausea, insomnia, and anxiety disorders. Ingestion of these pulverized rocks was able to soften nodules and was later used with other herbal ingredients to treat gallbladder cancer and urinary difficulties. In western medicine, beginning in the early 18th century, pumice was ground into a sugar consistency and with other ingredients was used to treat ulcers mostly on the skin and cornea. Concoctions such as these were also used to help wounds scar in a healthier manner. In approximately 1680 it was noted by an English naturalist that pumice powder was used to promote sneezing.

Personal care 

Pumice has been used as a material in personal care for thousands of years. It is an abrasive material that can be used in powdered form or as a stone to remove unwanted hair or skin. In ancient Egypt, it was common to remove all hair on the body to control lice and as a form of ritual purification, using creams, razors, and pumice stones. Pumice in powdered form was an ingredient in toothpastes in ancient Rome. Nail care was very important in ancient China; nails were kept groomed with pumice stones, and pumice stones were also used to remove calluses. It was discovered in a Roman poem that pumice was used to remove dead skin as far back as 100 BC, and likely before then. It has been used throughout many eras since then, including the Victorian Era. Today, many of these techniques are still used; pumice is widely used as a skin exfoliant. Even though hair removal techniques have evolved over the centuries, abrasive material like pumice stones is also still used. "Pumice stones" are often used in beauty salons during the pedicure process to remove dry and excess skin from the bottom of the foot as well as calluses. Finely ground pumice has been added to some toothpastes as a polish, similar to Roman use, and easily removes dental plaque build up.  Such toothpaste is too abrasive for daily use. Pumice is also added to heavy-duty hand cleaners (such as lava soap) as a mild abrasive. Some brands of chinchilla dust bath are formulated with powdered pumice. Old beauty techniques using pumice are still employed today but newer substitutes are easier to obtain.

Cleaning 

Pumice stone, sometimes attached to a handle, is an effective scrubbing tool for removal of limescale, rust, hard water rings, and other stains on porcelain fixtures in households (e.g., bathrooms). It is a quick method compared to alternatives like chemicals or vinegar and baking soda or borax.

Horticulture 
Good soil requires sufficient water and nutrient loading as well as little compaction to allow easy exchange of gases. The roots of plants require continuous transportation of carbon dioxide and oxygen to and from the surface. Pumice improves the quality of soil because of its porous properties, water and gases can be transported easily through the pores and nutrients can be stored in the microscopic holes. Pumice rock fragments are inorganic therefore no decomposition and little compaction occur. Another benefit of this inorganic rock is that it does not attract or host fungi or insects. Drainage is very important in horticulture, with the presence of pumice tillage is much easier. Pumice usage also creates ideal conditions for growing plants like cacti and succulents as it increases the water retention in sandy soils and reduces the density of clayey soils to allow more transportation of gases and water. The addition of pumice to soil improves and increases vegetative cover as the roots of plants make slopes more stable therefore it helps reduce erosion. It is often used on roadsides and ditches and commonly used in turf and golf courses to maintain grass cover and flatness that can degrade due to large amounts of traffic and compaction. With regard to chemical properties pumice is pH neutral, it is not acidic or alkaline. In 2011, 16% of pumice mined in the United States was used for horticultural purposes.

Pumice contributes to soil fertility in areas where it is naturally present in the soil due to volcanic activity. For example, in the Jemez Mountains of New Mexico, the Ancestral Puebloans settled on "pumice patches" of the El Cajete Pumice which likely retained a greater amount of moisture and was ideal for farming.

Construction
Pumice is widely used to make lightweight concrete and insulative low-density cinder blocks. The air-filled vesicles in this porous rock serves as a good insulator. A fine-grained version of pumice called pozzolan is used as an additive in cement and is mixed with lime to form a light-weight, smooth, plaster-like concrete. This form of concrete was used as far back as Roman times. Roman engineers utilized it to build the huge dome of the Pantheon with increasing amounts of pumice added to concrete for higher elevations of the structure. It was also commonly used as a construction material for many aqueducts. One of the main uses of pumice currently in the United States is manufacturing concrete. This rock has been used in concrete mixtures for thousands of years and continues to be used in producing concrete, especially in regions close to where this volcanic material is deposited.
New studies prove a broader application of pumice powder in the concrete industry. Pumice can act as a cementitious material in concrete and researchers have shown that concrete made with up to 50% pumice powder can significantly improve durability yet reduce greenhouse gas emissions and fossil fuel consumption.

See also

References

External links

 University of Oxford image of pumice. Retrieved 2010-09-27.
 Analytical identification of single source pumice from Greek shores and ancient sites in the Levant
 On the occurrence of a pumice-rich layer in Holocene deposits of western Peloponnesus, Ionian Sea, Greece. A geomorphological and geochemical approach.
 Hess Pumice - White papers and technical info of pumice.

Abrasives
Vitreous rocks
Volcanology
Industrial minerals
Igneous rocks
Personal hygiene products
Volcanic rocks